Californosaurus ('California lizard') is an extinct genus of ichthyosaur, an extinct marine reptile, from the Lower Hosselkus Limestone (Carnian, Late Triassic) of California.

Taxonomy

Merriam (1902) described it as a new species of Shastasaurus, S. perrini. He later recognized the species as generically distinct from the Shastasaurus type species, erecting Delphinosaurus for S. perrini. However, Delphinosaurus had been previously used for an ophthalmosaurid from Albian-Cenomanian deposits in European Russia, and Kuhn (1934) provided the generic replacement name Californosaurus. Merriam (1938) independently erected Perrinosaurus to replace Delphinosaurus, but this is a junior objective synonym.

Description

The long-snouted head is small in comparison with the rest of the body, as in basal ichthyosaurs such as Mixosaurus and Cymbospondylus. The tail is sharply turned downwards, in common with more advanced ichthyosaurs, with a small vertical fluke. It may have had a small dorsal fin. There is a small number of pre-sacral vertebrae (45 or 50). The phalanges (digit bones) are circular and widely spaced, giving the flipper a round appearance.

Biology
It fed on fish and other small marine creatures. Like other ichthyosaurs it probably never ventured onto dry land, and gave birth in the water.

See also
 List of ichthyosaurs
 Timeline of ichthyosaur research

References

M. W. Maisch. 2010. Phylogeny, systematics, and origin of the Ichthyosauria - the state of the art. Palaeodiversity 3:151-214

External links 
 Palaeos Vertebrates
 Ichthyosaurus

Late Triassic ichthyosaurs of North America
Fauna of California
Paleontology in California
Triassic California
Late Triassic first appearances
Late Triassic extinctions
Fossil taxa described in 1934
Ichthyosauromorph genera